Kemer District is a district of the Burdur Province of Turkey. Its seat is the town of Kemer. Its area is 373 km2, and its population is 3,000 (2021).

Composition
There is one municipality in Kemer District:
 Kemer

There are 7 villages in Kemer District:

 Akçaören 
 Akören 
 Belenli 
 Elmacık 
 Kayı 
 Pınarbaşı 
 Yakalar

References

Districts of Burdur Province